Christine Burkhalter is a Swiss practical sport shooter who took silver medal at the 2014 IPSC Handgun World Shoot in the Production division Lady category, and gold in the 2016 IPSC European Handgun Championship Standard division Lady category. Christine also has four Swiss National Lady Production titles (2011, 2013, 2014 and 2015) and one Swiss National Lady Standard title (2016).

References 

Living people
IPSC shooters
Swiss female sport shooters
1977 births
21st-century Swiss women